Nikita Stanislavovich Zhuravlyov (born 21 August 1994) is a former Russian football midfielder.

Club career
He made his debut in the Russian Football National League for FC Khimik Dzerzhinsk on 13 July 2013 in a game against FC Baltika Kaliningrad.

References

External links
 
 
 Career summary by sportbox.ru

1994 births
Living people
Russian footballers
Association football midfielders
FC Khimik Dzerzhinsk players
FC Baltika Kaliningrad players